Desna is an urban-type settlement in Vinnytsia Raion of Vinnytsia Oblast in Ukraine. It is essentially a northern suburb of the city of Vinnytsia. Desna belongs to Vinnytsia urban hromada, one of the hromadas of Ukraine. Population:

Economy

Transportation
Stadnytsia railway station is located just outside the settlement, on the railway connecting Vunnytsia and Kyiv via Koziatyn. There is infrequent passenger traffic.

The settlement is adjacent to Highway M12 and Highway M30 which jointly form the northern bypass of Vinnytsia. It is also incorporated to the road network of Vinnytsia.

References

Urban-type settlements in Vinnytsia Raion